The Golden Daffodil Stakes was a Group 3 flat horse race in Great Britain open to thoroughbred fillies and mares aged three years or older. It was run at Chepstow over a distance of 1 mile, 2 furlongs and 36 yards (2,045 metres), and it was scheduled to take place each year in July.

History
The event was named after the daffodil, a national emblem of Wales. It was established in 1994 and initially held listed status.

The Golden Daffodil Stakes was promoted to Group 3 level in 2003. It was briefly the only Group race staged in Wales. It was last run in 2005.

Records
Most successful horse:
 no horse won this race more than once

Leading jockey (2 wins):
 Seb Sanders – Film Script (2000), Mango Mischief (2005)

Leading trainer (2 wins):
 Luca Cumani – Papering (1996), One So Wonderful (1998)
 Henry Cecil – Fiji (1997), Sauterne (2001)

Winners

See also
 Horse racing in Great Britain
 List of British flat horse races

References
 Racing Post:
 , 
 horseracingintfed.com – International Federation of Horseracing Authorities – Golden Daffodil Stakes (2005).
 pedigreequery.com – Golden Daffodil Stakes – Chepstow.

Flat races in Great Britain
Chepstow Racecourse
Middle distance horse races for fillies and mares
Recurring sporting events established in 1994
Discontinued horse races
1994 establishments in Wales
Recurring sporting events disestablished in 2005
2005 disestablishments in Wales